A Nanny for Christmas is a 2010 comedy direct-to-video film, directed by Michael Feifer with a screenplay by Michael Ciminera and Richard Gnolfo. Starring Emmanuelle Vaugier, Dean Cain, Richard Ruccolo, Cynthia Gibb, and Sierra McCormick, the film was released on DVD November 23, 2010.

Synopsis
Ally (Emmanuelle Vaugier) is a smart young career woman who finds herself needing a new job. Samantha (Cynthia Gibb) is a busy Beverly Hills advertising executive/mom who's always too busy to take care of her kids. Danny Donner (Dean Cain) is the tough-guy owner of a chocolate company who wants a major hit ad for his company.

Cast

 Emmanuelle Vaugier as Ally Leeds
 Dean Cain as Danny Donner
 Richard Ruccolo as Justin Larose
 Cynthia Gibb as Samantha Ryland
 Sierra McCormick as Jackie Ryland
 Jared Gilmore as Jonas Ryland
 Sarah Thompson as Tina
 Stewart F. Lane as Mike Edelstein
 Clyde Kusatsu as Mr. Halligan 
 Stewart F. Lane as Mike Edelstein
 Bonnie Comley as Janet Edelstein
 Marla Maples as Brandy
 John Burke as Carl Ryland
 Michael Healey as News Reporter on Radio
 Caia Coley as Carol
 Anna Barnholtz as Kate Edelstein
 Aidan Schenck as Michael Edelstein
 Keith Dobbins as Santa Claus

Critical reception
DVD Verdict found the DVD transfer acceptable, with "fine detail and considerable depth", and solid audio, but found the film itself to be trite and derivative, writing that poor performances, absurd character behavior and horribly-written dialogue made the film "a pretty wretched viewing experience".

Conversely, 
Movie City News wrote "Only fans of the cast members and made-for-cable rom-coms will find something interesting here, I’m afraid."

References

External links
 

2010 films
American Christmas films
Films directed by Michael Feifer
2010s Christmas films
2010s English-language films